Christos Mantikas (1902 – 6 June 1960) was a Greek sprinter. He competed in the men's 400 metres at the 1932 Summer Olympics.

References

1902 births
1960 deaths
Athletes (track and field) at the 1932 Summer Olympics
Athletes (track and field) at the 1936 Summer Olympics
Greek male sprinters
Greek male hurdlers
Olympic athletes of Greece
Greeks from the Ottoman Empire
Sportspeople from Chios
20th-century Greek people